These hits topped the Dutch Top 40 in 1981 (see 1981 in music).

See also
1981 in music

References

1981 in the Netherlands
Netherlands
1981